Rosemount, historically called Ballybrickoge, is a village in County Westmeath, Ireland. It is located 5 km northeast of the town of Moate.

History 
Located close to the southwest border of the ancient Barony of Moycashel, Rosemount was once a stronghold of a prominent branch of the Geoghegan (Mag Eochagain) sept of the Southern UI Neill. Like other Geoghegans in Moycashel, and wider Westmeath, they lost most of their prized grazing land and lake fisheries to the Cromwellian and Williamite settlers (both undertakers and officers) after the Down Survey. Many of the Geoghegan family ancestors are interred in the mortuary chapel at Kill.

In 1932 Harvard Archaeological Society excavated a Bronze Age cairn (cemetery) with the remains of 44 graves from the sixth century on top of Knockastia  (or Cnoc Aiste), which at 200 m (656 ft) is one of the highest points in County Westmeath.

Amenities
Rosemount village consists of a pub, primary school, church and community centre. The community committee holds a harvest fair every year (weather permitting). The national school has been renovated with the addition of a new play yard, three new classrooms, a new computer room and a gym. Rosemount's GAA club has won 9 senior county titles, and are one of the most successful clubs in Westmeath.

Music industry
Rosemount has a recording studio called Grouse Lodge where musicians such as Paddy Casey, Morrissey, Muse, Snow Patrol and the Manic Street Preachers have recorded. Rosemount and Grouse Lodge appeared on US entertainment show Access Hollywood in November 2006, featuring an on-site interview with Michael Jackson who was spending some time there recording a new album.

Sport 

A book detailing the history of Rosemount G.A.A. and District was published in 1989, "The Black and Amber Story". Many individuals from the parish have played for Westmeath, and the club has nine Westmeath Senior Football Championship titles. As a rural club, development of young players has traditionally been important and this has resulted in a large number of successes in under-age finals, particularly in the 1970s.

After a 16-year spell out of the senior grade, which they won last in 1989, Rosemount won the Westmeath Intermediate Football Championship in 2016, and returned to the senior competition in 2017.

See also 
 List of towns and villages in Ireland

References

External links 
 Rosemount GAA

Towns and villages in County Westmeath